José Pierre Vunguidica (born 3 January 1990) is an Angolan professional footballer who plays for SpVgg Unterhaching.

Club career
In November 2010, he made his debut for the first-team of Bundesliga side Köln as a substitute in a 4–0 defeat against Borussia Mönchengladbach. In January 2011, he was loaned out to Kickers Offenbach. Vunguidica moved to 3. Liga club Wehen Wiesbaden on a free transfer in July 2012.

International career
Vunguidica was born in Angola, but moved to Germany at the age of 2 to avoid a civil war. He is a footballer for the Angola national football team since 2009.

References

External links
 
 José Pierre Vunguidica at kicker.de 

1990 births
Living people
Footballers from Luanda
Angolan footballers
Angola international footballers
Naturalized citizens of Germany
German footballers
Angolan emigrants to Germany
German people of Angolan descent
German sportspeople of African descent
Angolan expatriate footballers
Association football forwards
1. FC Köln players
1. FC Köln II players
SC Preußen Münster players
SV Wehen Wiesbaden players
SV Sandhausen players
1. FC Saarbrücken players
SpVgg Unterhaching players
Bundesliga players
2. Bundesliga players
3. Liga players
Expatriate footballers in Germany
2012 Africa Cup of Nations players
Angolan expatriate sportspeople in Germany